Syed Hassan Murtaza is a Pakistani politician who had been a member of the Provincial Assembly of the Punjab from August 2018 till January 2023. He served as the Parliamentary Leader of Pakistan Peoples Party in Punjab.

Early life
Syed Hassan Murtaza son of Syed Ghulam Murtaza, was born on November 9, 1960 at Rajoya Sadat, Chiniot, Chiniot District. He graduated in 1992 from University of the Punjab, Lahore and is an agriculturist.

Family
Syed Hassan Murtaza's uncle, Sardarzada Zaffar Abbass served as Member of the Provincial Assembly of Punjab during 1977-77, 1985–88, 1988–90 and as Member of the National Assembly of Pakistan during 1993-97. His maternal grandfather, Sardar Ghulam Abbas served as MLA twice before partition.

Political career
He is elected to the Provincial Assembly of the Punjab as a candidate of Pakistan Peoples Party from Constituency PP-95 (Chiniot-III) in 2018 Punjab Provincial Elections. He is a member of the following committees in the Provincial Assembly of the Punjab:

 Special Committee No.3
 Standing Committee on Law
 Special Committee No. 5
 Special Committee No. 10
Special Committee No.11

He was elected to the Provincial Assembly of the Punjab as a candidate of Pakistan Peoples Party from Constituency PP-74 (Jhang-II) in 2008 Punjab Provincial Elections. He was a member of the following committees in the Provincial Assembly of the Punjab:

 Standing Committee on Livestock and Dairy Development
 Public Accounts Committee No.I

He was elected to the Provincial Assembly of the Punjab as a candidate of Pakistan Peoples Party from Constituency PP-74 (Jhang-II) in 2002 Punjab Provincial Elections. He was a member of the following committees in the Provincial Assembly of the Punjab:

 Standing Committee on Religious Affairs and Auqaf

He previously served as a Member of District Council, Jhang during 1991 till 1992 and as Nazim Union Council No.18, Jhang during 2001 until 2002.

References

Living people
Pakistan People's Party MPAs (Punjab)
Punjabi people
Year of birth missing (living people)